Ronald Harris Jackson (October 22, 1933 – July 6, 2008) was an American professional baseball player and backup first baseman in Major League Baseball who appeared in 196 games over all or part of seven years (1954–1960) for the Chicago White Sox and Boston Red Sox. The native of Kalamazoo, Michigan, was an alumnus of Western Michigan University.

On June 15, 1954, amateur free agent Jackson signed a bonus contract with the White Sox that compelled him to remain on the major-league roster for two full seasons. He appeared in 80 total games in –, 45 of them as the starting first baseman, and hit six home runs. Then, the following season, he was selected the All-Star first baseman of the Triple-A American Association on the strength of his solid offensive season.

Remaining on the White Sox' roster all year, he appeared in 61 games and started 35 at first base, but he batted only .233 with seven home runs.

At the cutdown date, May 17, Boston traded him to the Milwaukee Braves for veteran Ray Boone, who had been part of the first-base platoon in Chicago in 1958. The Braves assigned Jackson to the American Association, and he never again played in the majors, retiring after the 1961 campaign.

In his seven-season MLB career, Jackson was a .245 hitter (116–for–474) with 17 home runs and 52 RBI, including 54 runs, 18 doubles, one triple, and six stolen bases.

In 148 games at first base, he recorded 1,054 outs and 56 assists while committing nine errors for a .992 fielding percentage.

Ron Jackson owned and operated his own insurance company in Kalamazoo after retiring from baseball. He died at age 74 in his native city on July 6, 2008.

Transactions
1954, Signed by the Chicago White Sox out of the Western Michigan University (bonus baby).
1959, Traded by Chicago to the Boston Red Sox in exchange for Frank Baumann.
1960, Traded by Boston to the Milwaukee Braves in exchange for Ray Boone (Jackson did not play for them).

References

External links

1933 births
2008 deaths
Baseball players from Michigan
Boston Red Sox players
Chicago White Sox players
Indianapolis Indians players
Louisville Colonels (minor league) players
Major League Baseball first basemen
Sportspeople from Kalamazoo, Michigan
Vancouver Mounties players
Western Michigan Broncos baseball players
Western Michigan University alumni